Gardinia boliviensis is a moth of the family Erebidae. It was described by Hering in 1925. It is found in Bolivia.

References

 Natural History Museum Lepidoptera generic names catalog

Lithosiina
Moths described in 1925